The Order of Saint Stephen was an order of chivalry founded in 1764 by Maria Theresa. In 1938, Miklós Horthy took the rights and activities of Grand Master as Regent of Hungary. The name of the Order changed to the Royal Hungarian Order of Saint Stephen. The Order was terminated at the time of the proclamation of the Second Hungarian Republic in 1946. It was recreated in 2011 as the Hungarian Order of Saint Stephen, and to this day remains the highest order in Hungary.

Significance to Hungarians
The order is named after Hungary's most famous king, Stephen I, whose reign (997–1038) was marked by his consolidation of the monarchy, the establishment of the medieval state of Hungary, and his adoption of Christianity as the state religion. His coronation, as recognized in the Church, is dated 1001. He died August 15, 1038, during the Feast of the Assumption. His feast day in Hungary is August 20. Canonized by Pope Gregory VII in 1083 along with his son Imre (who preceded him in death in 1031, after a hunting accident) and Bishop Gerhard of Hungary, St. Stephen is the patron saint of "Hungary, kings, the death of children, masons, stonecutters, and bricklayers." Though its exact provenance is somewhat disputed, the Crown of St. Stephen is said to have been a gift from Pope Silvester II, upon Stephen's 1001 coronation.

Creation and qualifications for membership

Empress Maria Teresa and her son, Emperor Joseph II, made several political concessions to ease tensions within their empire—most especially between Austria and Hungary, among them being the creation of the Order. Membership was available to various members of the Hungarian nobility. To receive the Order, according to collector and historian Stephen Herold,

Insignia

 Grand Cross For ceremonial purposes, a full set of robes were prescribed, following the tradition of other orders, such as the Austrian and Spanish Orders of the Golden Fleece and Great Britain's Order of the Garter. The robes were crimson and green, and were lined with ermine. A collar of gold was worn about the neck and shoulders, with the badge of the Order suspended from the collar. For normal occasions and every-day wear, a sash of crimson, edged with green, was worn over the right shoulder and extended to the left hip, the distinctive badge of the Order suspended from the sash at the hip. An eight-pointed star was worn on the left breast. During the waning days of the monarchy, especially during the Great War, a less formal option was also authorized, whereby a miniature (a so-called “kleine Decoration”) of the breast star was affixed to the center of the ribbon of an ordinary knight's cross, and was worn on the left breast with other orders and military medals, in order of precedence.
 Knights Commander Wore the badge of the Order at the throat, suspended from the crimson edged with green ribbon about the neck. During the Great War, the informal wear of the miniature, gold, Crown of Saint Stephen kleine Decoration was worn on an ordinary knight's cross, to delineate them from ordinary knights and Grand Cross knights, and worn on the left breast with other orders and military medals, in order of precedence.
 Knights Wore the badge of the Order, suspended from a tri-fold ribbon of crimson, edged in green, on the left breast with other orders and military medals, in order of precedence.

Partial list of members

The following is a partial list of knights of the Royal Hungarian Order of Saint Stephen, as compiled from a variety of sources listed in the bibliography. A nearly complete list, MAGYAR KIRÁLYI SZENT ISTVÁN REND, is available in the Hungarian language, online.

Grand Masters

 Empress Maria Teresa (May 13, 1717 – November 29, 1780), 1764–1780
 Emperor Josef II (March 13, 1741 – February 20, 1790), 1780–1790
 Emperor Leopold II (May 5, 1747 – March 1, 1792), 1790–1792
 Emperor Franz I (II) (12 February 1768 – 2 March 1835), 1792–1835
 Emperor Ferdinand I (April 19, 1793 – June 29, 1875), 1835–1848
 Emperor Franz Josef I (August 18, 1830 – November 21, 1916), 1848–1916
 Emperor Karl I (17 August 1887 – 1 April 1922), 1916–1922; deposed as emperor and king as a result of World War One, but never abdicated; received beatification ("Blessed Charles I") by Pope John Paul II, 2004
 Vitéz Miklós Horthy (18 June 1868 – 9 February 1957), 1938–1944
 Otto von Habsburg (20 November 1912 – 4 July 2011); stepped down from his role as head of the House of Habsburg in January 2007, in favor of his son Karl.
 Karl von Habsburg (born 11 January 1961), 2007–present

Order of St. Stephen – Kingdom of Hungary (1764–1918)

Knights, Grand Cross
 Prince Wenzel Anton von Kaunitz ( In Czech: Václav Antonin Kounic; 1711 – 1794), diplomat and foreign policy advisor to Maria Teresa, State Chancellor and Privy Councilor to Josef II
 Carl Friedrich Hatzfeldt zu Gleichen (September 14, 1718 – September 5, 1793), Austrian statesman; invested with the Grand Cross of the Royal Hungarian Order of Saint Stephen, May 6, 1764
 Prince Anton Esterházy de Galantha (11 April 1738 – 22 January 1794), Captain of the Hungarian Life Guards; also a member of the Order of the Golden Fleece; son of Field Marshal Prince Nicholas ("Miklós" in Hungarian) Esterházy, the primary patron of Joseph Haydn; nephew of Field Marshal Pal II Antal Esterházy
 Archduke Ferdinand of Austria-Este (1 June 1754 – 24 December 1806), fourth son of Emperor Franz I Stephen and Empress Maria Teresa; heir presumptive of the Duchy of Modena
 Archduke Maximilian Franz of Austria (1756–1801), fifth son of Emperor Franz I Stephen and Empress Maria Teresa; Grand Master of the Teutonic Order; Archbishop and Elector of Cologne
 Albert, Duke of Saxony-Teschen (11 July 1738 – 10 February 1822), husband of Archduchess Maria Christine, son-in-law of Emperor Franz I Stephen and Empress Maria Teresa, and brother-in-law of Emperors Joseph II and Leopold II
 Field Marshal Karl Josef gróf Batthyany (28. April 1697 – 15. April 1772), Field Marshal of Hungary
 Samuel von Brukenthal (1721–1803), Governor of Transylvania, personal advisor of Empress Maria Teresa.
 Ferdinand III, Grand Duke of Tuscany (May 6, 1769 – June 18, 1824), second son of Emperor Leopold II
 Archduke Charles, Duke of Teschen (September 5, 1771 – April 30, 1847), third son of Emperor Leopold II; Field Marshal of Austria
 Archduke Alexander Leopold of Austria (August 14, 1772 – July 12, 1795), fourth son of Emperor Leopold II; Palatine/Regent of Hungary
 Archduke Joseph, Palatine of Hungary (9 March 1776 – 13 January 1847), fifth son of Emperor Leopold II
 Archduke Johann of Austria (January 20, 1782 – May 11, 1859), sixth son of Emperor Leopold II; Regent of the Duchy of Styria, naturalist, industrialist
 Archduke Rainer of Austria (30 September 1783 – 16 January 1853), seventh son of Emperor Leopold II; Viceroy of the Kingdom of Lombardy–Venetia
 Archduke Louis of Austria (13 December 1784 – 21 December 1864), eighth son of Emperor Leopold II; Field Marshal of Austria; head of the State Conference (Regency) for Emperor Ferdinand

 Archduke Rudolf of Austria (January 8, 1788 – 24 July 1831), ninth son of Emperor Leopold II; Archbishop of Olomouc; Cardinal in the Catholic Church, from June 4, 1819
 Field Marshal Karl Phillip Fürst zu Schwarzenberg (April 18, 1771 – October 15, 1820), Field Marshal of Austria and Commander in Chief of the Grand Army of Bohemia during the Napoleonic Wars.
 Field Marshal Alfred Fürst zu Windisch-Graetz (May 11, 1787 – March 21, 1862), Field Marshal of Austria and chief commander of Austrian forces during the Hungarian Revolt, 1849
 Field Marshal Heinrich Hermann Josef Freiherr von Heß (1788–1870), Field Marshal of Austria and Chief of Staff to Emperor Franz Josef
 Friedrich Ferdinand graf von Beust (January 13, 1809 – October 24, 1886), Minister of Foreign Affairs, Kingdom of Saxony; later Privy Councilor to Franz Josef after assisting him in gaining the throne in Hungary;
 Archduke Albert, Duke of Teschen (August 3, 1817 – February 2, 1895), son of Archduke Charles; Field Marshal of Austria; Governor of Hungary
 Archduke Franz Karl of Austria (7 December 1802 – 8 March 1878), second son of Emperor Franz I (II) and younger brother of Emperor Ferdinand; Member of the State Conference (Regency) for his older brother, Emperor Ferdinand; father of Emperor Franz Josef of Austria-Hungary and Emperor Maximilian of Mexico

 Prince Klemens Wenzel von Metternich (May 15, 1773 – June 11, 1859), Minister of State, statesman and diplomat
 Napoleon II of France (March 20, 1811 – July 22, 1832), King of Rome, titular Emperor of the French, and Duke of Reichstadt ; son of Emperor Napoleon Bonaparte of the French, and his second wife, Archduchess Maria Luisa of Austria
 Count Alfred Josef Potocki (1817 – May 15, 1889), Member of the Austrian House of Peers and the Galician Diet; Vieceroy of Galicia, Minister-president (prime minister) of Austria, 1870 – 1871 
 Franjo (Francis) Haller of Hallerkeö (1796–1875), “Ban” (Viceroy) of Croatia, June 16, 1842 – 1845
 Count Gyula Andrássy de Csíkszentkirály et Krasznahorka (in Hungarian: csíkszentkirályi és krasznahorkai gróf Andrássy Gyula) (March 3, 1823 – February 18, 1890), Hungarian statesman and diplomat; first constitutional Premier of Hungary
 Emperor Maximilian of Mexico (July 6, 1832 – June 19, 1867), Archduke of Austria and Prince of Hungary and Bohemia; second son of Archduke Franz Karl; brother of Emperor Franz Josef I of Austria-Hungary
 Archduke Joseph Karl of Austria (2 March 1833 – 13 June 1905), second son of Archduke Joseph (Palatine of Hungary); General der Kavalrie in the Austro-Hungarian Army (K.u.K.)
 Archduke Karl Ludwig of Austria (30 July 1833 – 19 May 1896), third son of Archduke Franz Karl; brother of Emperor Franz Josef of Austria-Hungary and Emperor Maximilian of Mexico; father of Archduke Franz Ferdinand; grandfather of Emperor Karl I of Austria-Hungary
 Field Marshal Alexander von Krobatin (1849–1933); Field Marshal of Austria-Hungary
 Field Marshal Hermann Kövess von Kövessháza (1854–1924); Field Marshal of Austria-Hungary; invested with the Grand Cross of the Royal Hungarian Order of St. Stephen, 26 March 1918
 Field Marshal Eduard von Böhm-Ermolli (February 12, 1856 – December 9, 1941), Field Marshal of Austria-Hungary; honorary Army General of Czechoslovakia, 1928; honorary Generalfeldmarschall of Germany, 1938
 Archduke Friedrich, Duke of Teschen (4 June 1856, – 30 December 1936), eldest son of Archduke Karl Ferdinand; Field Marshal of Austria and Supreme Commander of the K.u.K. Army; godson and heir of Archduke Albrecht, Duke of Teschen; brother of Field Marshal the Archduke Eugen; invested with the Grand Cross of the Royal Hungarian Order of St. Stephen, 1 May 1894

 Kronprinz Rudolf (21 August 1858 – 30 January 1889), Archduke of Austria and Crown Prince of Hungary
 Archduke Eugen of Austria (May 21, 1863 – December 30, 1954), third and youngest son of Archduke Karl Ferdinand; Field Marshal of Austria-Hungary; invested with the Grand Cross of the Royal Hungarian Order of St Stephen, 30 March 1911; last Habsburg Grand Master of the Teutonic Order, 1894 – 1923
 Archduke Leopold Salvator of Austria (15 October 1863 – 4 September 1931), nephew of Ferdinand IV, Grand Duke of Tuscany; Colonel-General and Inspector General of Artillery in the Austro-Hungarian (K.u.K.) Army
 Archduke Franz Ferdinand of Austria-Este (December 18, 1863 – June 28, 1914), oldest son of Archduke Carl Ludwig; successor of Francis V, Duke of Modena; heir apparent of Emperor Franz Josef of Austria-Hungary; uncle of Emperor Karl I of Austria-Hungary
 Archduke Otto Franz of Austria (April 21, 1865 – November 1, 1906), second son of Archduke Carl Ludwig; brother of Archduke Franz Ferdinand; father of Emperor Karl I of Austria-Hungary
 Count István Tisza de Borosjenő et Szeged (22 April 1861 – 31 October 1918), Prime Minister of Hungary, 1903 – 1905, and 1913 – 1917
 Generaloberst Friedrich Graf von Beck-Rzikowsky (March 21, 1830 – February 9, 1920), president of the Military Chancery, General Adjutant to the Emperor, and Chief of the General Staff
 General der Kavalrie Alexander Graf von Üxküll-Gyllenband (October 2, 1836 – July 13, 1915), Privy Councilor and life member of the House of Lords; invested with the Grand Cross of the Royal Hungarian Order of Saint Stephen, August 12, 1907
 Prince Ladislaus Batthyány-Strattmann (October 28, 1870 – January 22, 1931), noble by birth, medical doctor by education; dedicated to providing medicine for the peasant class, and remembered as the “Doctor of the Poor”, Member of the Upper House from 1915; invested with the Order of the Golden Fleece, Royal Hungarian Order of Saint Stephen, and the Papal Order of the Golden Spur, 1915; beatified (“Blessed László”) by Pope John Paul II, 2003
 Generaloberst Karl Freiherr von Pflanzer-Baltin (1855–1925), commander of the 7th Army (K.u.K.), Chief of Staff to the 11th Corps, and Inspector General of Cavalry and later of Infantry; invested with the Grand Cross of the Royal Hungarian Order of Saint Stephen, August 25, 1918
 Generaloberst Eduard Graf von Paar (May 12, 1837 – February 1, 1919), General Adjutant to the Emperor
 Generaloberst Arthur frhr von Bolfas (April 16, 1838 – December 9, 1922), Chief of Staff to the 14th Corps, Chief of the Military Chancery, and General Adjutant to the Emperor
 Archduke Joseph August of Austria (9 August 1872 – 6 July 1962), son of Archduke Joseph Karl; Field Marshal of Austria-Hungary; claimed to have been awarded (by Emperor Karl I) a war decoration for his Grand Cross, October 1918, despite the fact that the Order was exclusively civilian
 Géza Baron Fejérváry de Komlós-Keresztes (1833–1914), Hungarian general officer and Prime Minister of Hungary, 1903 – 1907; invested as Knight, 1875, Knight Commander, 1882, and Grand Cross, 1901.
 Vice Admiral Miklós Horthy von Nagybánya (18 June 1868 – 9 February 1957), Vice Admiral of the Austro-Hungarian (K.u.K.) Navy, Commander-in-Chief of the Imperial Fleet, and Regent of Hungary.

 King Ernst August of Hannover (5 June 1771 – 18 November 1851), King of Hanover & Duke of Cumberland, fifth son of King George III of Great Britain, invested during a diplomatic visit from Prince Metternich
Giustino Fortunato (20 August 1777 – 22 August 1862), Prime Minister of the Kingdom of the Two Sicilies, 1849 – 1852, invested in 1850
 Georg V of Hannover (27 May 1819 – 12 June 1878), invested while crown prince, during a diplomatic visit from Prince Metternich
 Sir George Hamilton-Gordon, 4th Earl of Aberdeen (28 January 1784 – 14 December 1860), Prime Minister of the United Kingdom, 1852 – 1855
 Wilhelm I (March 22, 1797 – March 9, 1888), King of Prussia and German Emperor
 Friedrich III (October 18, 1831 – June 15, 1888), King of Prussia and German Emperor, invested while crown prince
 Edward VII of the United Kingdom (9 November 1841 – 6 May 1910), King of the United Kingdom, 1901 – 1910; invested with the Grand Cross of the Royal Hungarian Order of St. Stephen, June 13, 1867
 Chulalongkorn, King of Siam (1868–1910), invested with the Grand Cross of the Royal Hungarian Order of St. Stephen, 1869
 Wilhelm II (27 January 1859 – 5 June 1941), King of Prussia and German Emperor, 1888 – 1918; invested with the Grand Cross of the Royal Hungarian Order of St. Stephen, 1872
 Alfred, Duke of Saxe-Coburg and Gotha (1844–1900), Duke of Edinburgh and Saxe-Coburg and Gotha; Admiral of the Fleet of the British Royal Navy; invested with the Grand Cross of the Royal Hungarian Order of St. Stephen, 1873
 Prince Arthur, Duke of Connaught and Strathearn (1850–1942), Duke of Connaught and Strathearn; Field Marshal of the British Army; invested with the Grand Cross of the Royal Hungarian Order of St. Stephen, 1873
 Nicholas II of Russia (1868–1918), Emperor of Russia, November 1, 1894 – March 15, 1917; invested with the Grand Cross of the Royal Hungarian Order of St. Stephen, May 6, 1884

 Feldzeugmeister Duke Wilhelm of Württemberg (July 20, 1828 – November 6, 1896), invested October 18, 1891. Governor of Bosnia-Hercegovina
 Prince Leopold of Bavaria (February 9, 1846 – September 28, 1930), son of Prince Regent Luitpold of Bavaria (1821–1912) and Archduchess Augusta of Austria (1825–1864); Field Marshal (Generalfeldmarschall) of Bavaria; commander of German and Austro-Hungarian troops on the Eastern Front during World War I
 Porfirio Diaz (15 September 1830 – 2 July 1915), seven-time president of Mexico, invested with the Grand Cross of the Royal Hungarian Order of St. Stephen, September 30, 1901
 Ferdinand I of Bulgaria (February 26, 1861 – September 10, 1948), Tsar of Bulgaria, 7 July 1887 – 3 October 1918
 Alfonso XIII of Spain (May 17, 1886 – February 28, 1941), King of Spain, May 17, 1886 – April 14, 1931
 George V of the United Kingdom (June 3, 1865 – January 20, 1936), King of the United Kingdom, May 6, 1910 – January 20, 1936; invested with the Grand Cross of the Royal Hungarian Order of St. Stephen, 1902
 Großadmiral Alfred von Tirpitz (March 19, 1849 – March 6, 1930), grand admiral and Secretary of State of the Imperial Naval Office, Imperial German Navy, during World War One; invested with the Grand Cross of the Royal Hungarian Order of Saint Stephen, August 30, 1911
 Gennaro Granito Pignatelli di Belmonte (April 10, 1851 – February 16, 1948), Italian Cardinal of the Holy Roman Church, Papal Nuncio in Austria-Hungary (1904–1911), Dean of the Sacred College of Cardinals, later Grand Prior of Rome of the Sovereign Military Order of Malta; invested with the Grand Cross of the Royal Hungarian Order of Saint Stephen, August 30, 1911
 William John Arthur Charles James Cavendish-Bentinck, 6th Duke of Portland (December 28, 1857 – 26 April 1943)
 Generalfeldmarschall August von Mackensen (December 6, 1849 – November 8, 1945), Prussian Field Marshal
 Mindaugas II of Lithuania (né Wilhelm Karl Florestan Gero Crescentius von Württemberg, Prince of Urach, Count of Württemberg; May 30, 1864 – March 24, 1928), 3rd Duke of Urach; elected but uncrowned king of Lithuania, July 11 – November 2, 1918; invested 1917
 Zog I of Albania (ne Ahmet Muhtar Bej Zogolli, later Zogu)(8 October 1895 – 9 April 1961), Prime Minister 1922–24, President of Albania, January 21, 1926 – September 1, 1928, King of the Albanians, 9 September 1928 – 7 April 1939
 Pedro II of Brazil (2 December 1825 – 5 December 1891), Emperor of the Empire of Brazil (7 April 1831 – 15 November 1889)
 Karl Nesselrode (14 December 1780, 23 March 1862), Russian German Statesman and Diplomat of the Holy Alliance. Russian Empire Foreign Minister.

Knights Commander

 Johann Karl Chotek, Count of Chotkov und Wognin (1704–1787), Statesman and Chancellor in Bohemia; Feldzeugmeister; invested as Knight Commander upon the founding of the Order, 1764; later invested with the Grand Cross (1765)
 Leopold Stephen Graf Pálffy (b. 1716), invested as Knight Commander upon the founding of the Order, 1764; later invested with the Grand Cross (1765)
 Heinrich Kajetan Graf Blumegen (1715–1788), Landeshauptleute of Bohemia; invested as Knight Commander upon the founding of the Order, 1764; later invested with the Grand Cross (1765)
 Johann Vencel Graf Paar, invested as Knight Commander upon the founding of the Order, 1764; later invested with the Grand Cross (1765)
 Fetete Georgy Graf Galanthai (1741–1803), invested as Knight Commander upon the founding of the Order, 1764
 Ludwig Friedrich Riechsgraf von Zinzendorf und Pottendorf (1721–1780), invested as Knight Commander upon the founding of the Order, 1764
 Johann Amadeus Franz de Paula Baron von Thugut (May 24, 1733 – May 28, 1818), Austrian diplomat, 1769 – 1793; Foreign Minister of Austria, 1793 – 1800
 Count Charles Emerick Alexander von Rewischny (Rewitzky) (1737–1793), Hungarian diplomat,
 Miklós (Nicholas) grof Vay (1802–1894), member of the Hungarian Privy Council and the Hungarian Parliament; invested as Knight Commander, 1846.
 Ferenc (Francis) grof Haller, Ban of Croatia, invested as Knight Commander, 1847
 Feldzeugmeister Franz graf Gyulay (1798–1868), Austrian Minister of War; invested as Knight Commander, 1848.
 Cardinal János Scitovszky (1785–1866), Bishop of Rozsnyó and Pécs; Cardinal 1853; invested as Knight Commander, 1849.
 Cardinal György Haulik (1788–1869), Archbishop of Zagreb and Ban of Croatia; invested as Knight Commander, 1849
 Ferenc (Francis) grof Zichy (1811–1900), Secretary of State for Commerce, Széchenyi ministry of 1848, and later Austro-Hungarian Ambassador to Constantinople; invested as Knight Commander, 1849.
 Batthyány Imre (1781–1874), Jurist and Lord Lieutenant of Latvia; invested as Knight Commander, 1861.
 Stephen Melczer (1810–1896), member of the Hungarian Privy Council and House of the Lords; invested as Knight Commander, 1867.
 Baron Levin Rauch de Nyék (1819–1890), viceroy of Croatia-Slavonia, and of Kingdom of Croatia-Slavonia for four years (1867–1871); invested as knight Commander, 1869.
 Joseph Szlávy (1818–1900), Hungarian Prime Minister and later president of the Hungarian House of the Lords; invested as knight Commander, 1869.
 Baron Béla Orczy, Minister of Defense and Minister of the Interior; invested as Knight Commander, 1873.
 Feldzeugmeister Franz von Uchatius (1811–1881), ordnance expert and master artillerist, and member of the Viennese Academy of Sciences; invested as Knight Commander, 1875.
 Károly Csemegi (1826–1899), Hungarian judge and jurist; instrumental in the creation of the first criminal code in Hungary (1878); first Presiding Judge in the Hungarian Supreme Court; invested as Knight Commander, 1878.
 Sándor Matlekovits (1842–1925), Hungarian economist and author of several treatises on trade policy within the Austro-Hungarian Empire; invested as Knight Commander, 1885.
 Beniczky Ferenc, Hungarian aristocrat and Intendant of the Budapest Academy of Music and the Budapest Opera, from 1888; invested as Knight Commander, 1890.
 Daruváry Alajos (1826–1912), politician, member of both houses of the Hungarian Parliament, vice president 1898 – 1900; invested as Knight Commander, 1892.
 Generaloberst Artur frhr von Bolfras (1838–1922), chairman of the Military Chancery and general adjutant to Franz Josef I, 1889 – 1917; invested as Knight Commander, 1892.
 Dr. Heinrich Wittek (1844–1930), Austrian politician: Director General of the Ministry of Commerce, 1886 – 1897, Minister of Railways, 1897 – 1905; invested as Knight Commander, 1893.
 Semsey Andor (1833–1923), Hungarian naturalist and geologist; eventual member of the Hungarian Parliament; invested as Knight Commander, 1896.
 Dr. Miksa Falk, tutored Emperor Franz Josef I in the Hungarian language; invested as Knight Commander, 1898.
 Feldzeugmeister Oskar Potiorek (1853–1931), III Corps commander, 1897; eventual IG of the K.u.K. (1911–1913), Military Governor of Bosnia-Herzegovina (1912–1914), and 6th Army Commander (1914) ; invested as Knight Commander, 1906.
 Baron Guenther Heinrich von Berg (1765–1843) German Statesman, awarded June 9, 1820.

Knights

 Johann Christoph frhr von Bartenstein (1689–1767), Statesman and Privy Councilor to Karl VI, responsible for obtaining succession of Maria Teresa to the throne, personal tutor / educator of Josef II; Director of the House Archives; invested as a Knight of the Order upon its founding, 1764
 Johann Anton Graf Pergen (1725–1814), invested as a Knight of the Order upon its founding, 1764
 Friedrich frhr von Binder, invested as a Knight of the Order upon its founding, 1764; later invested as Knight Commander (1765)
 Koller Ferenc Nagymányai, invested as a Knight of the Order upon its founding, 1764; later invested as Knight Commander (1765)
 Franz Anton Felix Edler von Zeiller (January 14, 1751 – August 23, 1828), Imperial and Royal Courtier; Jurist, legal scholar, theorist and philosopher; Member of the academy; Invested as a Knight of the Order, 1810
 Feldzeugmeister Joseph frhr Philippovic von Philippsberg (April 30, 1818 – August 6, 1889), Commander of the 2nd (K.u.K.) Army and veteran of campaigns in Croatia, Prussia, Bosnia and Herzegovina; Invested as a Knight of the Order ("kleinkreuz"), November 24, 1864
 General der Kavallerie Arthur frhr von Gieslingen (June 19, 1857 – December 3, 1935), member of the General Staff, commander of the Theresian Military Academy, division commander in World War One, and member of the Privy Council; Invested as a Knight of the Order, March 12, 1909
 Feldmarschalleutnant Rudolph Schamshula, member of the General Staff, Chief of the Telegraph Bureau, and eventual commander of the 52nd Infantry Division during the Great War; invested 1918
 Oberst Ludwig von Sündermann, Chief of Staff, VIII. Corps, during the Great War; invested 1918
 Generalmajor Johann Straub von Burgauhof (November 14, 1866 – October 18, 1929), member of the General Staff; Chief and commandant of Military Railroads; invested 1918
 Generalmajor Josef Ritter von Paić (September 26, 1867 – April 21, 1933), invested 1918
 Feldmarschalleutnant Árpád Kiss von Nagy-Sittke (September 10, 1859 – March 6, 1921), invested 1918
 Feldmarschalleutnant Kolomann Török von Harasztos (October 16, 1858 – June 3, 1926), invested 1918
 Generalmajor Heinrich Graf von Hoyos (June 4, 1865 – April 28, 1955), invested 1918
 Feldmarschalleutnant Karl Andreas Aloys frhr von Bienerth (April 20, 1825 – March 5, 1882), invested 1918
 Oberst Theodor Zeynek (1873–1948), member of the General Staff; invested 1918
 Major Rudolf Kundmann, member of the General Staff; Adjutant to Chief of Staff Hötzendorf; kept a diary of life inside the General Staff; invested 1918
 Generalmajor Anton Hellebronth von Tiszabeö (b. December 20, 1858), invested 1918

The Royal Hungarian Order of Saint Stephen – Kingdom of Hungary (1920–1946)
After the dissolution of Austria-Hungary, Hungary and Austria could not make a legal agreement on the rights of the Order. The base of the argument was whether Maria Theresa founded the Order de jure as the sovereign of Hungary, or the sovereign of Austria, or as Holy Roman Empress. In 1938, when Austria as a de jure successor state of Austria-Hungary ceased to exist by becoming part of Germany, Horthy issued an addendum to be attached on 4 November 1938 to the statutes of the Order which declared that as long as the Regent was the head of the Kingdom of Hungary, he also held the powers and duties of the Grand Master.

Knights, Grand Cross
 Pál Count Teleki de Szék (1879–1941), Prime Minister of Hungary and Chief Scout of the Hungarian Scout Association, invested 1940
 Hermann Göring, Reichsmarschall of Germany
 Joachim von Ribbentrop, Reich Minister of Foreign Affairs, Germany
 Galeazzo Ciano, Minister of Foreign Affairs, Italy
 Jusztinián György Cardinal Serédi (1884–1945), Cardinal of Hungary, invested 1944

Knights Commander
 István Uray, Chief of the Regent's cabinet, invested 1943

See also
 Military Order of Maria Theresa
 Order of Franz Joseph
 Order of Leopold
 Order of St. George (Habsburg-Lorraine)
 Order of the Iron Crown
 Orders, decorations, and medals of Austria-Hungary
 Order of chivalry
 Hungarian Order of Saint Stephen

Notes

References

External links 

2011 CCII law from njt.hu

 
 3